of Japan, was a member of a collateral branch of the Japanese imperial family.

Biography
Prince Hirotada was the second son of Prince Fushimi Hiroyasu. His mother was Tokugawa Tsuneko, the 9th daughter of the last Tokugawa Shōgun, Tokugawa Yoshinobu. He succeeded his father to the head of the Kachō-no-miya household when he was only 2 years old in 1904.

Prince Kachō attended the Gakushuin Peers’ School. He entered the 49th class of the Imperial Japanese Naval Academy in 1918, graduating 1st out of 176 cadets. Prince Kuni Asaakira was one of his classmates. He served his midshipman duty on the cruiser Yakumo. In January 1922, he served for an obligatory session as a member of the House of Peers in the Diet of Japan, returning to the Imperial Japanese Navy in May of the same year as a second lieutenant. He was assigned to the battleship Mutsu. In 1923, he attended the naval artillery and torpedo schools. He then served on the cruiser Isuzu. In 1924, he was promoted to lieutenant and awarded the Grand Cordon of the Supreme Order of the Chrysanthemum. While serving on Isuzu, he fell ill and had to be hospitalized at the naval hospital at Sasebo, where he died.

On his death in 1924, the Kachō-no-miya line became extinct.

However, to preserve the Kachō-no-miya name and to ensure that the proper familial and ancestral rites were performed, the 3rd son of Prince Fushimi Hiroyasu agreed to a reduction in status from the imperial household to the kazoku peerage, and was renamed Marquis Kachō Hironobu.

References

 Jansen, Marius B. and Gilbert Rozman, eds. (1986). Japan in Transition: from Tokugawa to Meiji. Princeton: Princeton University Press. ;  OCLC 12311985
  . (2000). The Making of Modern Japan. Cambridge: Harvard University Press. ;  OCLC 44090600
 Keene, Donald. (2002). Emperor of Japan: Meiji and His World, 1852-1912. New York: Columbia University Press. ; OCLC 46731178
 Lebra, Sugiyama Takie. (1995). Above the Clouds: Status Culture of the Modern Japanese Nobility. Berkeley: University of California Press. 

1902 births
1924 deaths
Kachō-no-miya
Japanese princes
Imperial Japanese Navy officers
Recipients of the Order of the Paulownia Flowers
People from Tokyo